Charles and Taylor are an American Christian music duo. The brother and sister duo Charles & Taylor's are from Atlanta Georgia have released one album which was nominated for a Dove Award in 2006 in the "Urban Gospel Album" category, and they were nominated for the Atlanta Choice Awards in 2005 and 2006.
 
Their performances include the National Anthem spots at Atlanta Braves baseball and Atlanta Hawks basketball games, plus opening for artists such as Yolanda Adams, Vickie Winans, The Temptations and Mary Mary.

They are spokespeople for World Vision International.

Discography
Charles and Taylor
 I'm Not Ashamed
  I'm So Happy
  Still Gonna Pray
 You Are God Alone (not a god)
  I Worship You
  I've Been Blessed
  Just Kidding
  Better Than Life
  Heart Soul Mind
 Mama's Song (No One Loves Me Like You)
 Made to Worship You
 Go Tell It on the Mountain
 I'm Not Ashamed (Instrumental)

References

External links
charlesandtaylor.com Official Website

American gospel musical groups
Musical groups established in 2005